The Atlas to Accompany the Official Records of the Union and Confederate Armies (also referred to as the War of the Rebellion Atlas) was published as a companion piece to the Official Records of the American Civil War. It contains maps and other images derived from materials generated by both Union and Confederate military personnel during the American Civil War.

Creation and Composition
The Atlas was published by the United States Department of War in 1895. It features maps of engagements large and small including Gettysburg, the Siege of Vicksburg, Shiloh and the various epochs of the Atlanta campaign.

The Atlas is composed of 178 plates containing more than 1,050 individual graphic elements. Graphic elements include maps, line art illustrations derived from photographs, technical drawings, and other illustrations.

Content
The Atlas contains three general types of illustrations: maps, illustrations based on photographs, and illustrations/technical drawings.

Maps
A total of 156 plates containing maps ranging from small-scale engagements to regional views and date-specific snapshots of long-running sieges like Vicksburg and Atlanta.

Illustrations based on photographs
Twelve (12) plates that include images of Charleston Harbor and Fort Sumter, Missionary Ridge and various elements of mid-nineteenth century warfare.

Illustrations and technical drawings
Ten (10) plates containing diagrams of defensive elements (redoubts, redans, and forts, for example), equipment and armaments, uniforms, and flags.

Digitization by Baylor University
In the fall of 2010, the Digitization Projects Group of the Baylor University Electronic Library digitized an extremely high quality copy of the Atlas and placed the plates online via their Digital Collections site. The collection is searchable by keywords including state, city, military personnel and battle name, among others.

References

External links 
 Atlas to Accompany the Official Records of the Union and Confederate Armies from the Baylor University Digital Collections

American Civil War books
19th-century maps and globes
Historic maps of the Americas
Maps of the United States
Military equipment of the American Civil War
1895 non-fiction books
Atlases